Moonbabies is a Swedish duo formed in 1997 by vocalists, multi-instrumentalists, producers, and songwriters Ola Frick (Vocals, guitar and various instruments) and Carina Johansson (Vocals and keyboards).

History
Their earliest efforts recalled early Indie/Shoegazer influences by bands like My Bloody Valentine and Cocteau Twins, but with their 2004 album The Orange Billboard, developed into more sophisticated pop music with a touch of The Beach Boys and The Beatles, as well as experimentation with electronics. The Single/Mini-album War on Sound was released in 2005 and became an immediate indie-anthem and followed success on radio and TV-shows like Grey's Anatomy. In 2007 Moonbabies at the Ballroom was released, a somewhat more constructed and song-oriented album including Take me to the Ballroom, Shout it Out, Walking on my Feet and Cocobelle which all were frequently aired on college radio worldwide and included in several TV shows and commercials. The band played a series of shows at CMJ in New York in 2009, and started writing and recording their fourth studio album. Their comeback album Wizards on the Beach was released on their own label in April 2015 and was met with critical success in publications as BrooklynVegan and PopMatters as well as features on BBC radio 6. Ola and Carina has since then put the band on a hiatus due to becoming parents and pursuing careers in other fields.

Discography

Albums
Wizards on the Beach (2015)
Moonbabies at the Ballroom (2007)
The Orange Billboard (2004)
June and Novas (2001)

Singles
24' / 'The Ocean Kill' (Digital Single) (2014)
Chorus' / 'Raindrops' (Digital Single) (2014)
Take me to the Ballroom (Single) (2007)
War on Sound (Single) (2007)
War on Sound Mini Album (2005)
Forever Changes Everything Now (Single) (2004)
Sun A.M. (Single) (2004)
Standing on the Roof/Filtering the Daylight EP (7" Vinyl) (2002) Limited to 500 numbered copies
We're Layabouts EP (2001)
I'm Insane But so are You (7" Vinyl) (2000)
Air>>>Moon>>>Stereo EP (7" Vinyl) (1999)

References

External links
Official Website

Swedish musical groups